Streptomyces rhizosphaerihabitans is a bacterium species from the genus of Streptomyces which has been isolated from bamboo forest soil in Damyang on Korea.

See also 
 List of Streptomyces species

References

External links
Type strain of Streptomyces rhizosphaerihabitans at BacDive -  the Bacterial Diversity Metadatabase

 

rhizosphaerihabitans
Bacteria described in 2016